The English cricket team in South Africa in 1913–14 was organised by Marylebone Cricket Club (MCC).  The team played as MCC in the non-Test fixtures and as England in the five Test matches.  They played 18 first-class matches including the Tests, winning 9 times with 8 draws and 1 defeat.

England was captained by Johnny Douglas.  South Africa's captain in the Test series was Herbie Taylor. The series is notable for the exceptional bowling of England's Sydney Barnes, and the determined batting of South Africa skipper Herbie Taylor. It would be the last Test series to be played until after World War I, when England toured Australia in December 1920.

Test series summary
England won the Test series 4–0 with one match drawn.

Match length: 4 days (excluding Sundays). Balls per over: 6.

First Test

Second Test

Third Test

Fourth Test

Fifth Test

References

External sources
 Wisden Online 1915
 England to South Africa 1913-14 at Test Cricket Tours

Annual reviews
 Wisden Cricketers' Almanack 1915

Further reading
 Bill Frindall, The Wisden Book of Test Cricket 1877-1978, Wisden, 1979

1913 in English cricket
1914 in English cricket
1913 in South African cricket
1914 in South African cricket
International cricket competitions from 1888–89 to 1918
1913-14
South African cricket seasons from 1888–89 to 1917–18